We Met in Virtual Reality is a 2022 documentary film that takes place entirely within the video game VRChat. It explores the social relations developed by the users of VRChat during the pandemic, and how their lives were changed by their time on the platform. It was created by Joe Hunting, who was the director and writer of the script.

Plot
The film follows multiple figures throughout the runtime of the movie, in chronological order for over a year, often switching back and forth to explore their lives on the platform as their relationships evolve and change. There is a teacher who has an online sign language school, a couple that met online, as well as one of them running a school for dance classes, another couple who met online and also found love on the platform, as well as other users. The film finds out the reasons they use the platform and how it has helped them during the COVID-19 pandemic.

Release
It had its world premiere at the 2022 Sundance Film Festival on January 21, 2022. The film was released for air on HBO and streaming on its service on July 27, 2022 on HBO Max.

Reception

We Met in Virtual Reality gained a 94% critic rating from Rotten Tomatoes, with a 33 of the 34 reviews being favorable. Consensus reads, "We Met in Virtual Reality takes a visually striking approach to its investigation of human interactions on the VR plane, with surprisingly poignant results."

According to The Hollywood Reporter, "watching We Met in Virtual Reality, you very quickly notice that the two people cuddling have horns and a tail and that the airplane they seem to be sitting on doesn’t exist. The young woman with pink hair talking about her suicide attempt is laying underneath the stars, but until she laments that the clouds aren’t moving, you could almost forget that they’re virtual as well. And when the deaf ASL instructor talks about losing his brother during COVID and lights a virtual Japanese lantern in his honor, there’s nothing synthetic about the emotions you feel."

Engadget states, "it’s clear from We Met in Virtual Reality that he’s not just dropping into the community for a quick story. Instead, he sees the humanity behind the avatars and virtual connections." On the other hand, Wired gave a more critical review, noting that the documentary leaves out the drastic ways VR is changing in the wake of competitors such as Meta's conception of the metaverse, stating, "Hunting spends a lot of time showing there’s a culture worth preserving; if only he’d shown if anyone is trying to do it."

References

External links
 
We Met in Virtual Reality at Field of Vision

2022 documentary films
Films about virtual reality
Documentary films about video games
2020s English-language films
2022 independent films